Jim Uhls  is an American screenwriter known for his screenplays for Fight Club (1999) and Jumper (2008).

Uhls graduated from Drake University in 1979 with a Bachelor of Fine Arts degree and completed the Master of Fine Arts in Screenwriting program at UCLA School of Theater, Film and Television.

Credits
 Fight Club (1999)
 Jumper (2008)

References

External links
 

Living people
American male screenwriters
Drake University alumni
UCLA Film School alumni
Year of birth missing (living people)